The 2003 Cherwell District Council election took place on 1 May 2003 to elect members of Cherwell District Council in Oxfordshire, England. One third of the council was up for election and the Conservative Party stayed in overall control of the council.

Before the election the Conservatives were expected to lose seats after a recent large council tax rise. The results saw the Conservatives keep a majority but suffer a net loss of 3 seats after losing 2 seats each to Labour and the Liberal Democrats. The Labour winners included John Hanna who won by 44 votes after losing in the 2002 election by 8 votes. However the Conservatives did gain a seat in Banbury Grimsbury & Castle from Labour for the first in over 20 years. Meanwhile, the National Front stood a candidate for the first time to Cherwell Council and said that they would stand in all of the Bicester wards in the next election in 2004.

After the election, the composition of the council was:
Conservative 34
Labour 12
Liberal Democrat 4

Election result

Ward results

References

2003 English local elections
2003
2000s in Oxfordshire